Todos Santos is a town in Bolivia. It is located in Beni Department, more exactly in Iténez Province near Río Baures river.

References

Populated places in Beni Department